Fenoughil is a commune, and the capital of Fenoughil District, Adrar Province, in south-central Algeria. According to the 2008 census it has a population of 11,793, up from 9,962 in 1998, with an annual growth rate of 1.7%.

Geography 

These oases form part of a long longer string of oases known as the Tuat region, running from north to south through Adrar Province. Beyond the oases, the sandy Erg Chech desert lies to the west and the rocky Tademaït plateau lies to the east.

Climate 

Fenoughil has a hot desert climate (Köppen climate classification BWh), with extremely hot summers and mild winters, and very little precipitation throughout the year.

Transportation 

The main road in Fenoughil is the N6 national highway, which runs through the commune from Adrar in the north to Reggane in the south. The villages of Ben Henni, El Mansour and Bour Sidi Youssef lie on the highway, and a local road to the west connects to the villages of Allouchia, Albani, Tasfaout, and Kassbet Lahrar.

Education 

5.7% of the population has a tertiary education, and another 16.3% has completed secondary education. The overall literacy rate is 80.5%, and is 89.1% among males and 71.5% among females.

Localities 
As of 1984, the commune was composed of 11 localities:

 Zaouit Sidi Abdelkade
 Tasfaout
 Albani
 Allouchia
 Oudgha
 Ben Henni
 Azzi
 El Mansour
 Makra
 Ouled Moulay Lahssen
 Berchid
 Ouled Moulay Omar
 Kassbet Lahrar,Algeria
 Bour Sidi Youssef
 Baameur

References 

Neighbouring towns and cities

Communes of Adrar Province
Adrar Province